An extraordinary court, or special court, is a type of court that is established outside of ordinary judiciary, composed of irregularly selected judges or applies irregular procedure for judgment. Since extraordinary court can be abused to infringe fundamental rights of individuals, contemporaly most of countries ban such courts by constitution or statutes. Usually, modern military courts judged by court-martials are regarded as examples of extraordinary courts.

By country

Cambodia 

An extraordinary court is the Extraordinary Chambers in the Courts of Cambodia, which is basically a chamber in the national court of Cambodia that is specially designed to judge crimes of the Khmer Rouge such as the Cambodian genocide, but its judges are not of the ordinary Cambodian judiciary but are selected among international candidates nominated by Secretary-General of the United Nations, according to an agreement between United Nations and the Cambodian government.

Germany 

In modern Germany, the establishment of extraordinary courts is strictly prohibited by article 101(1) of the Constitution of Germany, in reflection of judicial murder by People's Court, which was a kind of  that was established during Nazi Germany. The term  itself means just the concept of 'special court', but the use of that term is discouraged, as it can referred to legacy of Nazis, That causes contemporary courts in Germany with special jurisdiction (such as 'Federal Social Court' on cases of social security matters) to be called a kind of 'specialized court', composed of ordinary judges.

In that way, Article 101(1) of the Constitution is explained as forbidding establishment of both extraordinary court and special courtas, which are substantially the same concept. As the Constitution bans judgments by irregularly-composed judges, courts in the City of Kempten with special jurisdiction on military justice in Germany are also constituted by ordinary judges, according to Section 11a of German Criminal Code.

South Korea 

In contemporary South Korea, the establishment of special courts, meaning extraordinary courts is exceptionally allowed only for a military court, according to Article 110(1) of the Constitution of South Korea. It is notable that Justices at the Constitutional Court must have qualification as judges, which includes Justices in the Supreme Court of Korea, in ordinary courts, but Article 111(2) of the Constitution does not rerquire military judges in the Military Court of Korea to have competence as ordinary court judges by 110(3) of the Constitution. The Constitutional Court of Korea explains that constitutional difference of qualification among ordinary court judges (including Supreme Court Justices), military judges and Constitutional Court Justices as constitutional grounds for non-qualified senior military officers to participate in military court judgments as adjudicators, together with qualified military judges in exceptional cases, according to article 22(3) of the Military Court Act.

See also 
 Court
 Military court
 Ordinary court
 Specialized court

References 

Courts by type